Yevgeni Yegorovich Kiselnikov (born 24 May 1962) is a former Russian football player.

References

1962 births
Living people
Soviet footballers
FC Irtysh Omsk players
Russian footballers
FC Tyumen players
Russian Premier League players

Association football goalkeepers